"Soliluna", is a Duet Studio album by the Latin Jazz Mexican Singers Magos Herrera and Iraida Noriega.

Track listing

 "Soliluna"
 "Estrellita" (Little Star)
 "New Song (Only Myself)"
 "Y Entonces" (And Then)
 "Modhina"
 "Lonely Woman (Round Midnight)"
 "Nature Boy"
 "Tu Risa" (Your Laugh)
 "Stop Blaming The Moon"
 "Chovendo Na Roseira"
 "El Patzcuaro"

References 

Magos Herrera albums
2006 albums